Scetlander (later known as Lander Software) was a software publisher which released titles for various 8- and 16-bit home computer systems in the 1980s and 1990s.

Games

Gold Series is a collection of educational games for the ZX Spectrum designed to make learning English and maths fun and easy. The games were then ported other various computers including Atari ST, Amiga, and Commodore 64 and MS-DOS. Each game focuses on a particular topic. The games can have their difficulty settings set to suit a player's skill, and cater for various age groups.

The Amiga and Atari ST versions were programmed by Terence Anthony Mancey.

Mix and Match
This game was created in 1988 for MS-DOS, coded by David Jolliff. It was ported to the BBC Micro in 1990 and ported to ZX Spectrum, Atari ST and Amiga in 1991. The technical editor of the game was Cliff Johnson. It is aimed to teach children under 5 years how match different objects together aided by the sea serpent Maggie. It also came with a Maggie badge in the pack along with a manual. The game is divided into four game types including "Two of a Kind", "Odd one Out", "Forget-me-not" and "Clock + Calendar". Each of those types (except the Calendar) have six activities: pictures, shapes, same, large, small, and numbers.

The game was also translated into the Belgian language on the Belgian Ministry of Education's behalf.

Count and Add
This game was designed for the ZX Spectrum in 1992. and was ported to the Atari ST the same year. The game is aimed to teach children how to count objects and add them together aided by Shades the dog. There are six activities:

Sets 1 - Count Objects on the screen
Sets 2 - Type the number of Objects require then reveal them
Animals - Count scattered Objects on the screen
Train - Count two different sets of Objects and add them together
Spider - Do addition sums before the spider reaches the butterfly
Clock - Tell the time on the clock

Hooray for Henrietta
This game is aimed to teach children aged 5–12 mathematics, including addition, subtraction, multiplication and division. It was created in 1989 by T.R. Tulloch for MS-DOS and ported to ZX Spectrum in 1990. The object of the game is to help the protagonist Henrietta save her trouble prone boyfriend Henry and recover his wedding clothes which have been stolen by the parrot John. In each maths activity, the player has a limited time to solve a number of problems before John can cover Henrietta in cold custard.

The game is the first to be produced as joint project with the Scottish Council for Education and Training. It also came with a John the Parrot badge and a guide for configuring and running the game.

In 1996 the game was remade for Windows, with 3D graphics and high quality sound and music.

Henrietta's Book of Spells
This game aims to teach children aged 7–14 language skills. It was created in 1989 by T. R. Tulloch for Archimedes A3000, Commodore 64 and MS-DOS. The game was ported to ZX Spectrum and Amiga in 1990 and ported to Atari ST in 1991. The object of the game is to help the protagonist Henrietta undo Morgana the Morbid's spell which turned her husband Henry into a frog. The difficulty of the game can be adjusted from five to nine letter words. Each activity earns the player a letter. Activities include:

Flash - Player has to memorise a word then type it in.
Complete - Player has to fill the gaps of a word with correct vowels.
Crack-It - Player has to decipher substituted letters.
Hangman - Player has to guess correct letters with a limited number of tries.
Jumble - Player has to crack an anagram of jumbled letters into a proper word.

After all five letters have been collected, the player must do a final Word Jumble to break Morgana's spell. The game was written in the STOS language by David Jolliff  but was written in the AMOS language for the Amiga.
In 1996 the game was remade for Windows with 3D graphics and using five different languages, including English, Spanish, French, German and Italian.

Spellbound
This game, designed by William Cochrane with graphics by Donald Anderson, teaches children spelling. Unlike the other games it has the platform of an arcade game. The object of the game is to guide a helicopter (in one level a submarine) driven by Hal through five levels while shooting Professor Grime's robots. In each level the player needs to collect all the letters that make up the goal word from the robots. After the winning a level the player must retype the goal word twice. The levels consist of Underground, Underwater, Downtown, North Pole and Space Base.

Other
In addition to the Gold Series Scetlander developed a number of other games, mostly for the BBC Micro computer.

Re-release
In 1994 WizardWorks re-released updated remakes of the two Henrietta games on CD.

In 1995 Lander Software released a "Lander Gold" CD compiling four games remade with 256 colour VGA graphics, mouse compatibility digitised sound and music. The CD included "Hooray for Henrietta", "Henrietta's Book of Spells", "Count and Add" and "Spellbound".

References

External links

Lander Software Official Site
"Henrietta's Book of Spells" Manual

Children's educational video games
Video games developed in the United Kingdom